Balisana is a village in Patan district, state of Gujarat, India. It is a biggest gam in 5 gam samaj where other villages are Sander, Manund, Valam, and Bhandu.
Big Masjid in Balisana 
Masjide Hanfiya

Villages in Patan district